This list of Ebola outbreaks records the known occurrences of Ebola virus disease, a highly infectious and acutely lethal viral disease that has afflicted humans and animals primarily in equatorial Africa. The pathogens responsible for the disease are the five ebolaviruses recognized by the International Committee on Taxonomy of Viruses: Ebola virus (EBOV), Sudan virus (SUDV), Reston virus (RESTV), Taï Forest virus (TAFV), and Bundibugyo virus (BDBV). Four of the five variants have caused the disease in humans as well as other animals; RESTV has caused clinical symptoms only in non-human primates. RESTV has caused subclinical infections in humans, producing an antibody response but no visual symptoms or disease state manifestations.

Transmission of the ebolaviruses between natural reservoirs and humans is rare, and outbreaks of Ebola virus disease are often traceable to a single case where an individual has handled the carcass of a gorilla, chimpanzee, bats, or duiker. The virus then spreads person-to-person, especially within families, in hospitals, and during some mortuary rituals where contact among individuals becomes more likely.

Learning from failed responses, such as during the 2000 outbreak in Uganda, the World Health Organization (WHO) established its Global Outbreak Alert and Response Network, and other public health measures were instituted in areas at high risk. Field laboratories were established to confirm cases, instead of shipping samples to South Africa. Outbreaks are also closely monitored by the United States Centers for Disease Control and Prevention (CDC) Special Pathogens Branch.

Nigeria was the first country in western Africa to successfully curtail the virus, and its procedures have served as a model for other countries to follow.

Events
The information in the following tables comes from the World Health Organization (WHO). This data excludes all laboratory personnel cases, Reston virus cases (since they are all asymptomatic), and suspected cases. For a complete overview, those cases are included below with footnotes and supporting sources.

Major or massive cases

Minor or single cases

List of other Filoviridae outbreaks

See also

 Ebola
 Ebola River
 Globalization and disease
 List of epidemics

Notes

References

Further reading
 
 

20th-century disease outbreaks
21st-century epidemics

Ebola, list